Each porcelain decorated by the Atelier Camille Le Tallec in Paris is signed by an LT motif in a Sèvres-like mark. Inside the LT motif appear two series of letters. First, a letter code in the upper part indicating the date of production of the piece, and second the initials of the piece's painter in the lower part. This dating system has been adopted from 1941. Le Tallec's pieces without these marks are likely to be produced between 1930 and 1941. Incrementation of the dating system was done every six-month period from 1941 to 1991, then every year since. By 1978, date of the transfer of the atelier from Belleville to rue de Reuilly in Paris, the date mark starts by R (for Reuilly), then the letter. By 1995, corresponding to the new installation at the avenue Daumesnil in Paris, the date mark starts by D (for Daumesnil) then the letter.

The sentences dessiné et peint entièrement peint à la main par Le Tallec à Paris France or Tiffany & Co - Private Stock and Le Tallec Paris - Made in France are also drawn.

Dating system table

Painter's initials  

List of the asserted painters of the Atelier Le Tallec:

AC, AD, AG, AK, AKG, AL, ALT, AM, CB, CC, CCT, CG, CGM, CH, CJ, CL, CLC, CLS, CM, CS, CV, DD, DL, ED, FE, FF, FG, FM, FN, FV, G, GC, GD, GH, GK, GL, GM, GP, HCR,HLR, HM, JD, JJ, JL, JLC, JN, LB, LC, LH, MC, MCD, MF, MFM, MJ, ML, MM, MMF, MP, MYB, MYR, NB, OO, PP, RB, RG, RJ, SD, SF, SFM, SG, SH, SHF, SM, SP, TP, VD, VM, YM, YP

References

Bibliography
 Keith and Thomas Waterbrook-Clyde, Atelier Le Tallec Hand Painting Limoges Porcelain, Schiffer Publishing, 2003

Porcelain of France